is a highway in Akita Prefecture and Iwate Prefecture, Japan, from  in Akita to  in Iwate.

See also

References

External links

107
Roads in Akita Prefecture
Roads in Iwate Prefecture